This is a list of broadcast television stations that are licensed in the U.S. state of Kentucky.

Full-power stations
VC refers to the station's PSIP virtual channel. RF refers to the station's physical RF channel.

Defunct full-power stations
 Channel 19: WAZE-TV - The CW - Madisonville/Evansville IN (10/15/1983-3/24/2011)
 Channel 21: WKLO-TV - Louisville (9/7/1953-4/20/1954)
 Channel 34 (RF channel 19): WBKI-TV - The CW - Campbellsville (7/27/1983-10/31/2017)

Low-power broadcasting (LPTV) stations
VC refers to the station's PSIP virtual channel, if it has one. RF refers to the station's physical RF channel.

Translators
VC refers to the station's PSIP virtual channel, if it has one. RF refers to the station's physical RF channel.

See also
 Kentucky media
 List of newspapers in Kentucky
 List of radio stations in Kentucky
 Media of cities in Kentucky: Bowling Green, Lexington, Louisville

Bibliography

External links
 
 Kentucky Broadcasters Association

Kentucky
 
Television stations